Janice Gross Stein  (born 1943) is a Canadian political scientist and international relations expert. Stein is a specialist in Middle East area studies; negotiation theory; foreign policy decision-making; and international conflict management.

She was the founding director of the Munk School of Global Affairs & Public Policy at the University of Toronto, where she is a professor.

Life and career
Stein holds degrees from McGill University (undergraduate and doctoral), and Yale University (master's).  She has been a professor at the University of Toronto since 1982, and was named a University Professor in 1996.

Stein is a specialist in Middle East area studies; negotiation theory; foreign policy decision-making; and international conflict management, on which she has lectured at the Centre for National Security Studies in Ottawa and at the NATO Defense College in Rome, Italy.

Stein is the founder and former director of the Munk School of Global Affairs at the University of Toronto and Associate Chair and Belzberg Professor of Conflict Management and Negotiation within the University of Toronto's political science department. Stein has been considered the central figure in making the Munk School a go-to-place for international affairs in Toronto. She has also been referred to as an academic entrepreneur.

Following the end of her directorship at the Munk School, Stein became the senior presidential advisor on international initiatives to the University of Toronto President, Meric Gertler.

Stein is a fellow of the Royal Society of Canada and an Honorary Foreign Member of the American Academy of Arts and Sciences.  Other organizational affiliations and memberships include:
 National Academy of Sciences' Workshop on Middle East Negotiations and the Committee on International Conflict Resolution
 Advisory Group on Cross-Cultural Negotiation
 United States Institute of Peace's Advisory Committee for Peacemaking in the 21st Century
 American Association for the Advancement of Science's Advisory Committee on Conflict Management in the Gulf
 American Academy of Arts and Sciences' Committee on Security
 Chair, International Centre for Human Rights and Democratic Development  
 Board Member, Canadian International Council

Honours

Stein was selected to give the 2001 Massey Lecture. She was awarded the Molson Prize by the Canada Council for an outstanding contribution by a social scientist to public debate, was awarded a Trudeau Fellow in 2003.

She is also the winner of the Mershon Prize for an outstanding contribution to public education on issues of national security.

She has been awarded Honorary Doctorate of Laws by the University of Alberta, the University of Cape Breton and McMaster University, as well as Hebrew University.

In 2006, she was made a Member of the Order of Canada. In 2007, she was awarded the Order of Ontario.

Publications and commentary

Janice Stein was a long-time member of the foreign affairs panel on the TVOntario television programs Studio 2 and Diplomatic Immunity, and continues as a regular guest on The Agenda. She has also appeared on CBC Television's The National numerous times.

In the scholarly arena, Professor Stein has authored over 80 books, book chapters and articles on intelligence, international security, negotiation processes, peace-making and public policy.

Books

 Networks of Knowledge

Coauthored books:

Choosing to Cooperate: How States Avoid Loss, with Louis Pauly
We All Lost the Cold War, with Richard Ned Lebow
Powder Keg in the Middle East: The Struggle for Gulf Security, with Geoffrey Kemp
Citizen Engagement in Conflict Resolution: Lessons for Canada in International Experience with David Cameron and Richard Simeon
The Unexpected War: Canada in Kandahar with Eugene Lang

References

External links
 Janice Stein: Brief Biography (Munk Centre for International Studies)
 Audio interview (with Eugene Lang) re: The Unexpected War

1943 births
Living people
20th-century Canadian non-fiction writers
Canadian television personalities
Canadian women non-fiction writers
Fellows of the Royal Society of Canada
McGill University alumni
Members of the Order of Canada
Members of the Order of Ontario
Academic staff of the University of Toronto
Canadian women television personalities
21st-century Canadian non-fiction writers
20th-century Canadian women writers
21st-century Canadian women writers